The Hurlbutt Street School is a historic one-room schoolhouse at 157 Hurlbutt Street in Wilton, Connecticut. Built in 1834, it served the town as a school for nearly a century, and was then converted to a local history museum.  It is the town's best-preserved 19th-century district school building, and was listed on the National Register of Historic Places in 1996.

Description and history
The Hurlbutt Street School stands in rural suburban eastern Wilton, on the west side of Hurlbutt Street between Friendlee Lane and Sharp Hill Road.  It is a single-story wood-frame structure, with a gable roof and clapboarded exterior.  The roof is capped by a belfry with pilastered arches that is topped by a cupola.  A shed-roof addition extends to the rear.  The main facade, set beneath one of the roof gables, is three bays wide, with sash windows flanking the center entrance.  The interior is finished with plaster walls and pine flooring, and is decorated to show what an early 20th-century schoolhouse looked like.  Not far from the school house stands an outhouse which is known to date to 1925 or earlier.

The schoolhouse was built in 1834, on a site nearby that had been used for schools since at least 1792.  It was built by local townspeople at no cost to the town, and served as a district school until the town consolidated its schools in 1935.  The local ladies' auxiliary, which had been formed a few years earlier to support improvements to the school, was then converted into a nonprofit organization dedicated to its preservation and conversion to a museum.

See also
National Register of Historic Places listings in Fairfield County, Connecticut

References

External links
Official web site

School buildings completed in 1834
Museums in Fairfield County, Connecticut
Education museums in the United States
School buildings on the National Register of Historic Places in Connecticut
Buildings and structures in Wilton, Connecticut
One-room schoolhouses in Connecticut
National Register of Historic Places in Fairfield County, Connecticut